Kaliman (also Romanized as Kalīmān; also known as Kalemān and Kalīmān-e Bālā) is a village in Gil Dulab Rural District, in the Central District of Rezvanshahr County, Gilan Province, Iran. At the 2006 census, its population was 255, in 71 families.

References 

Populated places in Rezvanshahr County